Nadterechny (masculine), Nadterechnaya (feminine), or Nadterechnoye (neuter) may refer to:
Nadterechny District, a district of the Chechen Republic, Russia
Nadterechnoye, a rural locality (a selo) in the Chechen Republic, Russia